Charles Wesley Flowers (August 13, 1913 – December 31, 1988) was a knuckleball  pitcher in Major League Baseball, appearing in 14 games for the Brooklyn Dodgers during the 1940 and 1944 seasons.

Flowers served in the Navy during World War II.

References

External links

Major League Baseball pitchers
Brooklyn Dodgers players
Baseball players from Arkansas
1913 births
1988 deaths
Knuckleball pitchers
New Iberia Cardinals players
Alexandria Aces players
Helena Seaporters players
Toledo Mud Hens players
San Francisco Seals (baseball) players
Los Angeles Angels (minor league) players
Louisville Colonels (minor league) players
Indianapolis Indians players
Montreal Royals players
Little Rock Travelers players
Jackson Senators players
Anniston Rams players
People from Cross County, Arkansas